Hemimyzon nanensis is a species of hillstream loach in the genus Hemimyzon. It occurs in the Chao Phraya basin, Thailand.

Footnotes 
 

Hemimyzon
Fish of Thailand
Endemic fauna of Thailand
Fish described in 1998